Robert Geatrex "Red" Heron (December 31, 1917 — December 14, 1990) was a Canadian ice hockey player who played 106 games in the National Hockey League between 1938 and 1942 for the Toronto Maple Leafs, Brooklyn Americans, and Montreal Canadiens. The rest of his career, which lasted from 1938 to 1942, was spent in the minor leagues.

Career statistics

Regular season and playoffs

References
Obituary at LostHockey.com

External links

1917 births
1990 deaths
Brooklyn Americans players
Canadian ice hockey left wingers
Montreal Canadiens players
Ontario Hockey Association Senior A League (1890–1979) players
Pittsburgh Hornets players
Ice hockey people from Toronto
Springfield Indians players
Syracuse Stars (AHL) players
Toronto Maple Leafs players
Toronto Marlboros players